Allen Knoll is a steep-sided snow dome rising from a flat snowfield  northwest of the head of Russell West Glacier, Trinity Peninsula, Antarctica. It was mapped from surveys by the Falkland Islands Dependencies Survey (FIDS) (1960–61) and named by the UK Antarctic Place-Names Committee for Keith Allen, a FIDS radio operator at Hope Bay in 1959 and 1960.

References 

Mountains of Trinity Peninsula